Angus Fraser is a Canadian film and television writer. He has most recently been executive producer and writer for Terminal City.

Career
Fraser is a native of Vancouver.

His drama Terminal City aired on The Movie Network on October 17, 2005. He was the director-creator, with Rachel Talalay also brought in as a director. Timeout says the show "prominently counts reality TV among its subjects, but its chief concerns—marriage, family and mortality—are timeless ones that are given fresh urgency by the way screenwriter Angus Fraser approaches them from odd angles."

Fraser's plot follows a family woman who finds she has cancer and becomes the star of a reality show simultaneously. He was partly inspired by a close call his mother had with cancer, and his own near-death experience when he was stabbed in the heart as a bouncer. In 2008 Terminal City was picked up by Sundance.

He also co-wrote the films A Girl Is A Girl, Witnesses and Wiseguys, and A Complicated Kindness.

Filmography
Kissed (1996)
A Girl is a Girl (1999)
The Love Crimes of Gillian Guess (2004)

TV credits
Terminal City (2005)

References

External links

Canadian male screenwriters
Canadian television producers
Canadian television writers
Living people
Year of birth missing (living people)
21st-century Canadian screenwriters
21st-century Canadian male writers